Daning or Da Ning may refer to:

 Daming in Inner Mongolia, China, formerly known as Daning when it was the capital of the Ning Province of the Ming Empire
 Daning County in Shanxi, China
 Daning, Guangxi (大宁), a town in Hezhou, Guangxi, China